Cloud One was a 1970s studio disco band on P & P Records, produced by Peter Brown and Patrick Adams. They were best known for the 1976 album Atmosphere Strut and its title track, and the single "Patty Duke".

Discography
Atmosphere Strut - 1976
Spaced Out -  Delmar Donnell
Charleston Hopscotch - Peter Brown
Dust To Dust	
Atmosphere Strut	
Disco Juice	
Doin' It All Night Long

Funky Disco Tracks of Cloud One - 1978
Jump, Jump, Jump -	10:28
Funky Track -	7:07
Stomp Your Feet And Dance -	10:25
Music Funk -	10:32
Happy Music -	3:09

References

American musical groups
Musical groups established in the 1970s